The Solar System (Spanish: El sistema solar) is a 2017 Peruvian-Spanish comedy-drama film directed by Bacha Caravedo & Chinón Higashionna and written by Caravedo. It is based on the homonymous play by Mariana de Althaus. The film stars Leonor Watling, Gisela Ponce de León, Cesar Ritter, Adriana Ugarte, Javier Valdés and Sebastián Zamudio.

Synopsis 
Christmas night at the Del Solar family's house becomes a reunion full of reproaches, extreme tensions, surprising revelations and, perhaps, a reconciliation. Leonardo, the patriarch, arrives sick along with his son Pavel's ex-girlfriend, for whom he left his wife.

Cast 
The actors participating in this film are:

 Adriana Ugarte as Agnes
 Leonor Watling as Inés
 Gisela Ponce de León as Edurne
 Cesar Ritter as Pavel del Solar
 Sebastian Zamudio as Puli
 Javier Valdes as Leonardo del Solar

Release 
The film opened on November 3, 2017 in Spanish theaters, while in Peru it was released on the 16th of the same month.

See also
 List of Christmas films

References

External links 
 

2017 films
2017 comedy-drama films
Peruvian comedy-drama films
Spanish comedy-drama films
2010s Peruvian films
2010s Spanish-language films
Films set in Peru
Films shot in Peru
Films about families
Films based on plays
2010s Spanish films